Marie Marguerite, Duchess of Anjou (née María Margarita Vargas Santaella; born 21 October 1983) is a Venezuelan heiress and wife of Prince Louis, Duke of Anjou, who is considered by Legitimists to be the rightful king of France, making her the queen consort of France and Navarre in the eyes of the Legitimists.

Early life
Marie Marguerite was born on 21 October 1983 in Caracas. Her father, Víctor José Vargas Irausquín, is the owner of Banco BOD or Banco Occidental de Descuento (BOD Bank or Western Bank of Discount - WBD). Her mother is Carmen Leonor Santaella Tellería. She has a sister, María Victoria, who is married to Francisco Javier d'Agostino Casado. She also had a brother, Víctor José, who died young.  She studied at the Colegio Merici de las Madres Ursulinas in Caracas and did her degree on pedagogy at the Universidad Metropolitana de Caracas.

Personal life
She married Prince Louis, Duke of Anjou in a civil ceremony in Caracas on 5 November 2004 and in a religious ceremony the following day at La Romana, Dominican Republic. The couple have a daughter, Princess Eugénie, Madame Royale (born 5 March 2007) at Mount Sinai Hospital, Miami, Florida. She gave birth to twin boys, Louis, Dauphin of France and Prince Alphonse, Duke of Berry (Spanish: Luis and Alfonso), on 28 May 2010. They currently live in Madrid, Spain. The couple had their fourth child, Prince Henri, Duke of Touraine, on 1 February 2019 in New York.

Heraldry 

As the current titular queen of France and Navarre, Marie Marguerite had her arms remade by French heraldists Hervé, Baron Pinoteau and Xavier d'Andeville in 2016. Her arms include, as heraldic tradition expects, a parti (per pale) of her husband's arms (in this case the full arms of France) and her father's (here the remade arms of the Vargas family) ; surmounted by the royal crown of France.

Ancestry

References

Bibliography
Cassani Pironti, Fabio. Bref crayon généalogique de S.A.R. la Princesse Marie-Marguerite, Duchesse d'Anjou, née Vargas Santaella, Le Lien Légitimiste, n. 16, 2007.

|-

1983 births
Living people
People from Caracas
Venezuelan Roman Catholics
Marie Marguerite
Marie Marguerite
Dames of Malta